655 Park Avenue is a Georgian-style co-op residential building on Manhattan's Upper East Side, located on Park Avenue between 67th Street and 68th Street, adjacent to the Park Avenue Armory. It was developed in 1924 by Dwight P. Robinson & Company. The building at 655 Park Avenue was designed by architects James Edwin Ruthven Carpenter, Jr., often referred to by the initials "J.E.R. Carpenter", and Mott B. Schmidt. Carpenter is considered the leading architect for luxury residential high-rise buildings in New York City in the early 1900s, while Schmidt is known for his buildings in the American Georgian Classical style, including Sutton Place and houses for New York City's society figures and business elite.

Building
655 Park Avenue is designed in the Georgian architectural style, with a limestone base on the lower floors, and brick masonry on the upper floors. The building is centered around a courtyard garden facing Park Avenue. The building's staggered height design, perhaps unique among Park Avenue co-ops of its era, was a result of restrictions placed on the developer by a syndicate of owners of nearby mansions who sold the land on which 655 Park Avenue was built. This "Battle for Suitable Scale at 655 Avenue" is described in Andrew Alpern's book Historic Manhattan Apartment Houses. The 11-story main mid-block building has an 8-story wing on 67th Street and a 7-story wing on 68th Street. It has a duplex penthouse with a 3,000-square-foot roof terrace and lower terraces atop the 68th Street and 67th Street wings. 655 Park Avenue has entrances on 67th Street and 68th Street and full-time doormen and elevator operators.

Notable residents
 William Kissam Vanderbilt II, heir, motor racing enthusiast, and yachtsman
 Isaac Newton Phelps Stokes, architect and author of The Iconography of Manhattan Island
 Danielle Steel, author
 Charles Richard Crane, industrialist, heir, and noted Arabist
 Schuyler Chapin, art patron and general manager of the Metropolitan Opera
 William Coley, cancer researcher
 Barbara Goldsmith, author, journalist, and philanthropist
 Admiral Joseph J. ("Jocko")  Clark, United States Navy

See also
 620 Park Avenue
 625 Park Avenue
 643 Park Avenue
 720 Park Avenue
 730 Park Avenue
 740 Park Avenue

References

Further reading

External links
 655 Park Avenue review at www.cityrealty.com

Residential buildings completed in 1924
Georgian Revival architecture in New York City
Upper East Side
Park Avenue
Residential buildings in Manhattan